Taiwan Space Agency (short as TASA), formerly the National Space Organization (NSPO), is the national civilian space agency of the Republic of China (Taiwan), under the auspices of the National Science and Technology Council. TASA is involved in the development of space technologies and related research.

Vision and Mission
TASA was founded in order to develop and conduct researches on aerospace and natural science in Taiwan. Its mission is to be a center of innovation and excellence for space technology and to develop space programs that applies Taiwan's strength and global competitiveness.

Organization
TASA headquarters and the main ground control station are in Hsinchu. The TASA is organized as follows: In April 2022, the Legislative Yuan passed a bill that upgraded the NSPO to a directly affiliated agency of the Ministry of Science and Technology, and renamed Taiwan Space Agency.

TASA also has numerous laboratories, such as:
 System Simulation Laboratory
 Thermal Control Laboratory
 Microwave Communication Laboratory
 Data Processing Laboratory
 Attitude Determination and Control Laboratory
 Electro-optics Laboratory
 Structure Development Laboratory
 Electrical Power Laboratory
 Multi-layer Insulation (MLI) Laboratory

History

1991
 10/03The Executive Yuan approved the "Space Technology Long Term (15 years) Developmental Program"; established National Space Program Office.

1994
 09/09Held a groundbreaking ceremony for the construction of Satellite Integration & Test Building
 11/01Signed a frequency coordination contract with an US company Telecom Strategies
 12/12Signed a ground system contract with the US company Allied Signal Technical Service Corponation (ATSC)

1996
 06/30The completion of the five domestic component engineering model development; start the manufacture of flight unit.

1997
 04/25Held a FORMOSAT-1 antenna installment ceremony at Tainan National Cheng Kung University.
 05/16The Spacecraft Bus was delivered to the Satellite Integration & Test Building of National Space Program Office from Los Angelus, USA
 07/11The Vice President Lien officiated the opening ceremony of the Satellite Integration & Test Building.

1998
 06/21National Science Council announced the result for the "Naming and Drawing Competitions", and finalized that the satellite will be named "FORMOSAT-1" 
 10/07The completion of FORMOSAT-1 satellite system integration and tests.

1999
 01/27FORMOSAT-1 was being launched into the orbit and started executing its scientific missions.
 02/13The Ocean Color Imager of FORMOSAT-1 took its first ocean color image.
 03/16Dr Wong Hung-Chih took on the Director General position of the National Space Program Office.
 06/30Held a contract signing ceremony for the FORMOSAT-2 X-band antenna system.
 12/15The commencement of the development of FORMOSAT-2.

2018
 02/01Dr. Chun-Liang Lin took on the Director General position of National Space Organization
 02/23President Tsai Meets with FORMOSAT-5 Satellite Team
 08/03President of the Executive Yuan Ching-te Lai inspected FORMOSAT-7 preparation
 09/21FORMOSAT-5 Imagery Service Begins

2019
 02/21President Ing-wen Tsai Visited NSPO
 06/25FORMOSAT-7 satellites launched into space by SpaceX on Falcon Heavy
 07/17FORMOSAT-7/COSMIC-2 successfully observed the first Radio Occultation profile

2020
 03/07FORMOSAT-7/COSMIC-2 atmospheric data were released
 04/30FORMOSAT-3 constellation Completes its Mission with Honor

2021
 01/24YUSAT and IDEASSAT CubeSats launched
 02/03Formosat-7 constellation deployment was completed
 05/31"Space Development Act" Passes Legislature's 3rd Reading
 08/02professor of NCTU and head of Advanced Rocket Research Center Jong-Shin Wu established as new manager of NSPO
 09/30Taiwanese seeds return from space
 10/27signs contract on collaboration with NanoAvionics

2023
National Science and Technology Council placed under the direct oversight of the National Science and Technology Council and renamed the Taiwan Space Agency. The Chinese name was not changed.

Taiwanese rocket launch program
TASA developed several suborbital launch vehicles based on the Sky Bow II surface-to-air missile. There have been six to seven launches as of 2010.

Taiwanese satellite launch vehicle program
Little has been publicly revealed about the specification of Taiwan's first launch vehicle for small satellites (SLV) (小型發射載具). It should be able to place a 100 kg payload to a 500–700 km orbit. This SLV will be a major technological improvement based on existing sounding rockets and will consist of four solid propellant stages with two strap-on solid rocket boosters. Therefore, it will be in the same class of the Indian SLV-3. The inaugural launch was scheduled to take place during the second phase of the 2004–2018 space project (第二期太空計畫), placing a Taiwanese-made satellite into orbit and after the preparatory launches of 10 to 15 sounding rockets (探空火箭).

Taiwanese designed and built satellites

Formosat (formerly ROCSAT)

The FORMOSAT (福爾摩沙衛星) name derived from Formosa and satellite (formerly ROCSAT (中華衛星) = Republic of China (ROC) + satellite (sat)).

Formosat-1 (formerly ROCSAT-1): Communications and ionospheric research satellite, launched in January 1999.
Formosat-2 (formerly ROCSAT-2): Ionospheric research and surface mapping satellite, launched May 2004.
Formosat-3/COSMIC: Constellation of six microsatellites to perform GPS occultation studies of the upper atmosphere. Collaborative project with US agencies including NASA, NOAA and the University Corporation for Atmospheric Research, launched in April 2006.
Formosat-5:  Optical earth observation and magnetic field research as a successor to the Japanese Reimei mission. Cooperation with Japan and Canada. Launch was originally planned for 2011, it was launched in 2017.
Formosat-6 was a micro satellite project, its development was cancelled. 
Formosat-7 is a group of 6 satellites in low inclination orbits to provide meteorology data at low and mid latitudes. Launch took place in June 2019.

Others
YamSat: Series of picosatellites (volume 1000 cubic cm, weight roughly 850 grams) designed to carry out simple short duration spectroscopy missions. Originally planned for launch in 2003 by a Russian launch vehicle but cancelled due to political pressure from the Russian government.
Arase: JAXA mission to study the inner magnetosphere, launched 2016. Taiwan provided an instrument.
RISESAT: microsatellite developed by Tohoku University, Japan, launched in 2019. Taiwan provided an instrument.
Flying Squirrel, developed by National Central University and launched in 2021.
Yushan, developed by MoGaMe Mobile Entertainment and launched in 2021.

Planned missions
Triton, The FORMOSAT-7R (TRITON) is a micro-satellite designed and manufactured by NSPO. It is planned along with the FORMOSAT-7 program, thus it continues to use FORMOSAT serial number and subjoins a letter “R” for identification. Known as the “wind hunter” the satellite will measure sea winds and provide a supplement to the FORMOSAT-7 constellation. The name ”Triton” is given due to its mission. Triton is to be launched in 2021 by Arianespace SA from the Kourou launch complex in French Guiana. The Triton satellite will be 87% Taiwanese made, an improvement from the Formosat-7's 78%.
Formosat-8, remote sensing satellite planned to follow Triton.
Nut, developed by National Formosa University. To be launched in June 2021.

Developments and long term plans
The first phase of Taiwan's space program involves the development of the human and technological resources required to build and maintain three satellite programs, which is expected to be completed with the launch of Formosat-3/COSMIC by the end of 2005. Currently, the spacecraft and instrumentation are designed and assembled in Taiwan by local and foreign corporations and shipped to the U.S. for launch by commercial space launch firms. TASA, the military, and Chungshan Institute of Science and Technology have also been working on the development of a sounding rocket for upper atmospheric studies.

The second phase is scheduled to take place between 2006 and 2018. It will involve an emphasis on developing technological integration and miniaturization capabilities required for the development of constellations of microsatellites, as well as encouraging growth in the local aerospace industry.

Since 2009, TASA has been working with university research teams in developing innovative technology to improve the overall efficiency of hybrid rockets. Nitrous oxide/HTPB propellant systems were employed with efficiency boosting designs, which resulted in great improvements in hybrid rocket performance using two patented designs. So far, several hybrid rockets have been successfully launched to 10~20 km altitudes, including a demonstration of in-flight stops/restarts. By the end of 2014, they will attempt conducting suborbital experiments to 100~200 km altitude.

There have been proposals to elevate NSPO's status to that of a national research institute, however such plans were under debate Legislative Yuan as of late 2007.

In 2019 the Ministry of Science and Technology announced an expected cost of NT$25.1 billion (US$814 million) for the third phase of the National Space Program. The third phase will see at least one satellite launched per year between 2019 and 2028.

In August 2019 Thailand's Geo-Informatics and Space Technology Development Agency announced that they would consult with TASA on developing their own indigenous satellites.

In 2021 the Taiwanese legislature passed the Space Development Promotion Act which is meant to incentivize increased private sector participation in space industries.

See also
 Advanced Rocket Research Center
 List of government space agencies

References

External links
NSPO website
GlobalSecurity article on Taiwan's space program
Encyclopedia Astronautica – Taiwan

Space agencies
Space program of Taiwan
Executive Yuan
Buildings and structures in Hsinchu
1991 establishments in Taiwan
Scientific organizations based in Taiwan